Leung King may refer to:
 Leung King Estate, a public housing estate in Tuen Mun, Hong Kong
 Leung King stop, an MTR Light Rail stop adjacent to the estate